Gigantapseudes is a genus of crustaceans belonging to the monotypic family Gigantapseudidae.

The species of this genus are found in Malesia.

Species:

Gigantapseudes adactylus 
Gigantapseudes maximus

References

Crustaceans